"I'm So into You" is a song recorded by American R&B vocal trio SWV for their debut studio album, It's About Time (1992). Written and produced by Brian Alexander Morgan, the song was released in January 1993 as the second single from the album. It was commercially successful, becoming their first top-ten single in the United States, peaking at number six on the Billboard Hot 100. It also reached number two on the Billboard Hot R&B/Hip-Hop Songs chart and was certified Gold by the Recording Industry Association of America (RIAA) for selling 600,000 copies.

Critical reception
Pan-European magazine Music & Media described "I'm So into You" as a "poignant swingbeat tune". Andy Beevers from Music Week rated it four out of five, writing, "This excellent single from the teenage female trio, Sisters With Voices, has been the most in-demand US import for the past couple of weeks. Its not hard to see why with its combination of tight soul harmonies and supremely funky mixes from Teddy Riley and Allen Gordon." He added that it "should go a long way towards establishing them as a tougher alternative to En Vogue."

Track listings
 UK CD single
 "I'm So into You" (Allstar's Drop Check Dance Mix) 		
 "I'm So into You" (Allstar's 12" Drop Mix) 		
 "I'm So into You" (Teddy's Extended Mix) 		
 "I'm So into You" (Allstar's Drop Radio Mix) 		
 "I'm So into You" (Teddy's Radio Mix)

 US CD maxi single
 "I'm So into You" (Teddy's Radio Mix) – 4:35 	
 "I'm So into You" (Teddy's Radio Mix With Rap) – 4:16 	
 "I'm So into You" (Allstar's Drop Radio Mix) – 4:47 	
 "I'm So into You" (Allstar's 12" Drop Mix For Radio) – 5:15 	
 "I'm So into You" (Allstar's Drop Check Dance Mix) – 5:51 	
 "I'm So into You" (Teddy's Extended Mix With Rap) – 5:05 	
 "I'm So into You" (Teddy's Instrumental Bonus) – 5:33 	
 "I'm So into You" (Radio Remix With Rap) – 4:12

 US cassette single
A1: "I'm So into You" (Original Radio Version/Video Version) – 4:07
A2: "I'm So into You" (12" Funky Club Mix) – 6:21
B1: "I'm So into You2 (The Funkstrumental Vocal Dub Mix) – 6:10
B2: "SWV (In the House)" – 3:00

Charts

Weekly charts

Year-end charts

Certifications

Release history

References

1992 songs
1993 singles
Music Week number-one dance singles
RCA Records singles
Songs written by Brian Alexander Morgan
SWV songs